The Oath is a short lived 1976 American TV anthology series. It consisted of two films, 33 Hours in the Life of God and Sad and Lonely Sundays. The series did not proceed but the two episodes aired as stand alone movies.

33 Hours in the Life of God
33 Hours in the Life of God is a 1976 American TV movie. It was directed by Glenn Jordan.

It screened alongside Sad and Lonely Sundays.

Plot
33 hours in the life of a top surgeon.

Cast
Hal Holbrook as Dr Simon Abbott
Carol Rossen as Alison Abbott
Hume Cronyn as Dr Paul Jaffe
Louise Latham as Nurse Levitt

Reception
The Los Angeles Times called it "old fashioned and predictable".

The Sad and Lonely Sundays
The Sad and Lonely Sundays is a 1976 American TV movie. It was a sequel to 33 Hours in the Life of God and was based on a script by Rod Serling.

Cast
Jack Albertson as Dr George Sorenson
Will Geer as Lucas Wembly
Ed Flanders as Dr Frankman
Eddie Firestone as Dr Bainbridge
Doreen Lang as Hester
Dorothy Tristan as Gloria Evans
Jeff Corey as Dean Miller
Dori Brenner as Sandy
Bert Remsen as Mort Cooper

References

External links

1976 television films
1976 films
American television films